Herschel or Herschell may refer to:

People
 Herschel (name), various people

Places 
 Herschel, Eastern Cape, South Africa
 Herschel, Saskatchewan
 Herschel, Yukon
 Herschel Bay, Canada
 Herschel Heights, Alexander Island, Antarctica
 Herschel Island, Canada
 Herschel Island (Chile), an island of the Hermite Islands archipelago
 Mount Herschel, Antarctica
 Cape Sterneck, Antarctica

Astronomy 
 Herschel (crater), various craters in the solar system
 2000 Herschel, an asteroid
 35P/Herschel–Rigollet, a comet
 Herschel Catalogue (disambiguation), various astronomical catalogues of nebulae
 Herschel Medal, awarded by the UK Royal Astronomical Society
 Herschel Museum of Astronomy, in Bath, United Kingdom
 Herschel Space Observatory, operated by the European Space Agency
 Herschel wedge, an optical prism used in solar observation
 Herschel's Garnet Star, a red supergiant star
 William Herschel Telescope, in the Canary Islands
 Telescopium Herschelii, a constellation
 Uranus, for a time known as Herschel

Other uses 
 Allan Herschell Company, which specialized in amusement park rides
 Herschel–Bulkley fluid, a generalized model of a non-Newtonian fluid
 Herschel baronets, of the United Kingdom
 Herschel Girls' School, a private day and boarding school in Cape Town
 Herschel Grammar School, in Slough, Berkshire, England
 Herschel graph, a bipartite undirected graph
 Herschel Greer Stadium, in Nashville, Tennessee
 Herschel Walker trade, the largest player trade in the history of the National Football League
 Herschel Supply Co., Canadian backpack manufacturer
 USNS Hershel "Woody" Williams (T-ESB-4), sister ship of USNS Lewis B. Puller (T-ESB-3), a mobile landing platform
 Herschel, a specific heptomino and methuselah (cellular automaton) in Conway’s Game of Life
 Herschel, a a 1926 boat of the Mackenzie River watershed

See also 
 Hersch
 Hirsch (disambiguation)
 Hirsh